Danilo Restivo (born 3 April 1972) is an Italian double murderer. Restivo is serving a life sentence with a 40-year tariff for murdering his neighbour Heather Barnett in 2002. Investigators' suspicions that Restivo had murdered Barnett were raised because of his alleged involvement in the 1993 disappearance of Elisa Claps in Potenza, Italy, but he was not charged due to insufficient evidence. Subsequent to the 2010 discovery of Claps's body, Restivo was tried for the murder of Barnett, with evidence of similarities in ritualistic placing of hair on the bodies of Claps and Barnett being heard by the English court. He was found guilty of murdering Barnett, and later found guilty in his absence for murdering Claps by an Italian court.

Background
Restivo was born in Sicily. In 1993 he was living with his parents and his elder sister in the city of Potenza, in Basilicata  Southern Italy. He would attempt to arrange dates with girls by claiming to have a present for them. Restivo harassed those who rejected him with phone calls in which he would play a soundtrack to Profondo Rosso (English title: Deep Red), a giallo film about a serial killer who plays a melody before every murder. Restivo was known to police, who believed him be responsible for nine incidents in which women had had their hair clandestinely cut. He was also thought to have tied up two children before cutting one with a knife. A magistrate refused to issue an arrest warrant for Restivo in June 1994, but four months later he was taken into custody. An Italian policeman who questioned Restivo described him as "cunning" and "precise in his answers".

Murder of Elisa Claps
Elisa Claps, the 16-year-old daughter of a tobacconist and a clerk, was a student in the third year of the high school in Potenza, and a devout Catholic, with ambitions to become a physician and work with Médecins Sans Frontières. She was the youngest of three children and was described as very close to her family. Friends reported Claps felt sorry for Restivo, who appeared lonely and depressed. She  wrote several pages in her secret diary complaining about his odd behaviour. Despite misgivings, she agreed to meet Restivo at the 15th-century Chiesa della Santissima Trinità in the centre of the city, after Restivo phoned and asked for a date, pretending he had a love match with a friend of hers and asking for suggestions.

On Sunday 12 September 1993, Claps, accompanied by a female friend, went to meet Restivo at the church, arriving at approximately 11:30 a.m., just as Mass had ended. When she did not return home, Claps' elder brother, Gildo, telephoned Restivo's family residence and was told that Restivo was out of town due to university essays and had no knowledge of Claps's whereabouts. When Gildo went to the church, he discovered the priest in charge, Domenico Sabia, had suddenly left for some days, taking with him the only key giving access to the upper storey of the church building. Sabia later opposed a search of the church.

Gildo reported the disappearance of his sister to police, but was initially told the matter had "no urgency". When a policeman questioned him, Restivo fell into a near-hysterical state, then admitted that he and Claps had spent some time together discussing the girl he had fallen in love with. Claps had then left the church, while he had stayed to pray. He added that Claps had seemed frightened and had confided to him that she "had been harassed by a boy before entering the church". Later that day, he said, he had gone to Naples, where he was a freshman at the Faculty of Dentistry. Restivo claimed to have hurt his hand while taking a short-cut through a building site. The Restivo family declined the policeman's request for clothes Restivo had worn on that Sunday morning. Moreover, the fiancé of Restivo's sister, a young man named Giovanni M., told the police that Restivo had looked terrified about that little cut on his hand and had insisted on being accompanied to the emergency room. Giovanni stated that Restivo's jacket looked very dirty and soaked with blood.

Conspiracy-theorising and false leads
Claps' disappearance was the subject of intense media interest and speculation. The assumption that Claps had subsequently left the church moved the focus of the investigation away from the church building and onto other lines of inquiry; the church was not thoroughly searched. Claps' close friend who had accompanied her on the day of her disappearance told investigators that she had last seen Claps outside the church at 11:30 a.m., at which point Claps had departed to meet Restivo in the church. She claimed Claps had told her she would be back in half an hour. Prosecutors accused her of lying and suspected her of involvement in the disappearance; they asserted that she had been seen with Claps later in the day. The young woman, aged only 16, later confided to several friends that she was worried that she could have met the same fate as Claps if she had been with her.

An acquaintance of Claps said that she had been abducted by criminals. Claps' diary had a page missing; tests suggested that there were words written in Albanian. A connection to Albania was thought by some to be the most promising line of inquiry. Police also suggested Claps could have run away with her boyfriend or something similar. Claps' elder brother, Gildo, alleged that the investigation into his sister's disappearance had been hindered by deference to prominent community figures. The investigation was taken away from the Potenza authorities and moved 120 km away to Salerno.

In 2012, Tobias Jones wrote:"The case gradually became, for many, an obsession, one of the iconic Italian mysteries that enabled people to engage in dietrologia, literally 'behindery' or conspiracy-theorising. Claps' face—her long, dark hair, thick glasses and carefree smile—haunted the nation."

Trial
In 1996, Restivo was tried for giving false information. He testified that he had met Claps in a curtained area behind the altar before she left minutes later. Tried along with Restivo were an Albanian man and Claps' close friend. Restivo alone was convicted, he was sentenced to 20 months imprisonment and lost an appeal. Because short sentences are suspended in Italy, Restivo remained free and without restriction on his movements.

The prosecution appealed against the acquittal of Claps' friend, and at a second trial she was found guilty on a charge of perjury and sentenced to 14 months' imprisonment; the Italian Supreme Court later overturned the conviction. In Italy, as part of  the Italian Code of Criminal Procedure, the accused is presumed innocent, and both the defendant and the prosecution can appeal a court's judgment. An appeal triggers what is essentially a trial de novo, in which all evidence and witnesses can be re-examined. A further appeal can be made to the Italian Supreme Court of Cassation (Corte di Cassazione), but only on procedural grounds or on issues of the interpretation of law.

Body discovered
Sabia died in 2008; and denied ever being acquainted with Restivo, but a photograph of Restivo's 18th birthday party emerged  showing Sabia had been one of the guests. In March 2010, a body was found in the church. Forensic DNA analysis initially suggested the body was not that of Claps, but on re-testing it was found to be hers. Strands of Claps' own hair had been cut from her head shortly after her death and placed near her hands. Italian investigation found DNA and other evidence indicating Restivo was the murderer of Claps. Her funeral service took place on 2 July 2011 and the Holy Mass was celebrated by Don Marcello Cozzi, an Italian priest well known for his strong battles against the mafia and crime. A large number of people from all Italy took part in the ceremony.

Murder of Heather Barnett

In May 2002, Restivo arrived in England, and moved in with a Bournemouth woman. He lived in Richmond Park across the street from Heather Barnett, a mother of two who worked from home as a seamstress. Restivo visited Barnett's flat on 6 November 2002. At that time, Barnett's spare key went missing, forcing her to have the locks changed. On 12 November 2002, Barnett was found in the upstairs bathroom by her son and daughter, aged 14 and 11, after they came home from school. She had been bludgeoned to death with a hammer, her breasts had been cut off and laid beside her head, and 9cm (3.5in) strands of someone else's cut hair had been placed in her right hand. Further, the front door was unlocked, the car's radio was still playing, and there were signs of a struggle in the house. Hysterical, the children fled the house, and were comforted by Restivo and his partner, who helped them call the police.

Investigation
The time of death was estimated to be shortly after Barnett had returned home after taking her children to school that morning. Forensic investigation showed the killer had left few traces at the crime scene apart from a green towel stained with blood. Luminol tests showed a trail of bloody shoe-prints that ended suddenly, this was thought to indicate the killer had changed his shoes before leaving Barnett's house.

Restivo was not immediately a person of interest for detectives. Along with his Italian landlady, Fiamma, he was taken to Bournemouth Police station on the evening of the 12th. With no translator at hand, Fiamma translated. At that interview, he had produced a bus ticket with a time-stamp of 8:44 a.m. to support his alibi of having been on his way to a computer course at the time of the murder. Restivo was questioned by the police in mid 2003 and released without charge. The detective leading the inquiry later said that Restivo gave the impression of being "bumbling". In the light of Restivo's connection to Claps' disappearance and suspicious behaviour detectives regarded him as the chief suspect, but there was not sufficient evidence for a prosecution.

In March 2004, he was put under close surveillance using electronic tracking and listening devices; police overheard Restivo being spoken to by his parents and female companion as if he were a child. He was observed on repeated visits to a park where he was covertly filmed as he apparently stalked lone women. On 12 May 2004 the surveillance team became alarmed, a uniformed patrol was ordered to stop and search Restivo on a pretext. Although it was a warm day, he was wearing a hoodie over his head and waterproof over-trousers. In his car police found an identical change of clothing, filleting knife, scissors, a balaclava and gloves. In June 2004 a schoolgirl identified Restivo as the man who had cut her hair on a bus; in November 2006 he was rearrested and his home searched. Police found a lock of hair.  Trainers he had worn on the day of the murder had internal traces of blood, but it could not be identified due to having been soaked in bleach. In 2008 new techniques revealed a bloodstained towel left at the murder scene had a DNA match for Restivo, but he claimed to have left it on the visit to the home of Barnett on 6 November. The evidence was still judged insufficient for a prosecution.

Trial and appeal
In a move that the prosecutor said was unrelated to the Italian investigation, it was decided that the evidence against Restivo was sufficient for a prosecution. When the body of Claps was discovered, it became clear that her friend had been telling the truth, and she later testified via a video link at Restivo's trial. Two months after the remains of Claps were found, Restivo was charged with the murder of Barnett. As the case drew international attention, women in the UK and Italy began to report to police cases where a perpetrator matching Restivo's description, had secretly cut their hair either on a bus or in a cinema.

It was ruled that the English court could hear evidence that Restivo had murdered Claps in Italy, and about the similarities of that murder with the murder of Barnett. Italian investigators testified to the English court that DNA recovered from the clothes on the body of Claps matched Restivo and was consistent with blood. When in May 2011, Restivo was found guilty of murdering Heather Barnett, the judge sentenced him to spend the rest of his life in prison. Appealing against the whole life term, Restivo's lawyers argued the judge was wrong to take the Claps' murder into account when sentencing Restivo for the murder of Barnett, as Restivo had not been convicted of it at that time. In November 2012, the Court of Appeal ruled in favour of Restivo and altered his minimum sentence to 40 years, but said it was "highly improbable" he would ever be released. In 2014, Restivo appealed against a decision he should be deported, the Home Secretary having ordered his transfer to Italy, where he would be jailed for life.

Related legal review
In 2011, the Criminal Cases Review Commission began examining the conviction of Omar Benguit to determine whether it should be referred to the Court of Appeal. After juries at two previous trials had failed to agree on a verdict, Benguit was found guilty in January 2005 on a charge of murdering Jong-Ok Shin, a 26-year-old Korean woman who had come to England to study. She was attacked yards from her home, three blocks from where Restivo lived, in the early hours of 12 July 2002. Benguit's lawyers said the main prosecution witness in the case was unreliable; while several lines of circumstantial evidence pointed to Restivo. One of these was the unusual coincidence that Restivo had also murdered his victims on the 12th day of the month. In a 2014 hearing, the Court of Appeal ruled the verdict was consistent with the testimony from the witness, who had not changed her evidence, and Benguit's conviction was upheld.

Media
 How They Caught: Danilo Restivo, Crimewatch, BBC TV, 12 September 2006
Michael Litchfield, The Cutter, John Blake Publishing Limited, 2011
 Federica Sciarelli, Gildo Claps, Per Elisa: Il caso Claps. 18 anni di depistaggi, silenzi e omissioni, Rizzoli, 2011
Tobias Jones, Blood on the Altar: In Search of a Serial Killer, Faber & Faber, 2012
 Pierangelo Maurizio, L'uomo che amava uccidendo. La storia di Danilo Restivo, Koinè Nuove Edizioni, 2012
Elisa Claps & Heather Barnett, Casefile True Crime Podcast, Episode 114, 15 June 2019

References

External links
 BBC report with surveillance video,
BBC TV program, Crimewatch How They Caught: Danilo Restivo
 Danilo Restivo cited as murderer of Jong Ok-Shin in July 2002

1972 births
Living people
Male murderers
20th-century Italian criminals
21st-century Italian criminals
Bournemouth
Crime in Dorset
Italian emigrants to the United Kingdom
Italian male criminals
Italian people convicted of murder
Italian prisoners sentenced to life imprisonment
Murder in England
Murder in Italy
People from Potenza
Prisoners and detainees of England and Wales
2002 murders in the United Kingdom
1993 murders in Italy
2002 in England